The Sevastopol Constituency (No. 219) is a Russian legislative constituency in Sevastopol. The constituency is the only one in Sevastopol, and occupies the whole of its territory.

Members elected

Election results

2016

|-
! colspan=2 style="background-color:#E9E9E9;text-align:left;vertical-align:top;" |Candidate
! style="background-color:#E9E9E9;text-align:left;vertical-align:top;" |Party
! style="background-color:#E9E9E9;text-align:right;" |Votes
! style="background-color:#E9E9E9;text-align:right;" |%
|-
|style="background-color:"|
|align=left|Dmitry Belik
|align=left|United Russia
|46,960
|33.24%
|-
|style="background:;"| 
|align=left|Oleg Nikolayev
|align=left|Party of Growth
|33,791
|23.92%
|-
|style="background-color:"|
|align=left|Vladimir Komoyedov
|align=left|Communist Party
|24,504
|17.35%
|-
|style="background-color:"|
|align=left|Ilya Zhuravlyov
|align=left|Liberal Democratic Party
|14,443
|10.22%
|-
|style="background-color:"|
|align=left|Mikhail Bryachak
|align=left|A Just Russia
|6,817
|4.83%
|-
|style="background-color:"|
|align=left|Andrey Brezhnev
|align=left|Rodina
|2,737
|1.94%
|-
|style="background:"| 
|align=left|Ivan Yermakov
|align=left|Patriots of Russia
|2,589
|1.83%
|-
|style="background:;"| 
|align=left|Mikhail Tretyakov
|align=left|Communists of Russia
|2,554
|1.81%
|-
|style="background:"| 
|align=left|Nikita Shtykov
|align=left|The Greens
|1,831
|1.30%
|-
| colspan="5" style="background-color:#E9E9E9;"|
|- style="font-weight:bold"
| colspan="3" style="text-align:left;" | Total
| 141,267
| 100%
|-
| colspan="5" style="background-color:#E9E9E9;"|
|- style="font-weight:bold"
| colspan="4" |Source:
|
|}

2021

|-
! colspan=2 style="background-color:#E9E9E9;text-align:left;vertical-align:top;" |Candidate
! style="background-color:#E9E9E9;text-align:left;vertical-align:top;" |Party
! style="background-color:#E9E9E9;text-align:right;" |Votes
! style="background-color:#E9E9E9;text-align:right;" |%
|-
|style="background-color:"|
|align=left|Tatyana Lobach
|align=left|United Russia
|85,359
|53.37%
|-
|style="background-color: " |
|align=left|Vladimir Brakovenko
|align=left|Communist Party
|19,262
|12.04%
|-
|style="background-color:"|
|align=left|Ilya Zhuravlyov
|align=left|Liberal Democratic Party
|18,490
|11.56%
|-
|style="background-color:"|
|align=left|Vladimir Yatsenko
|align=left|A Just Russia — For Truth
|11,482
|7.18%
|-
|style="background-color:"|
|align=left|Aleksey Savvateyev
|align=left|New People
|9,468
|5.92%
|-
|style="background:"| 
|align=left|Aleksandr Kubryakov
|align=left|The Greens
|6,807
|4.26%
|-
|style="background-color:"|
|align=left|Andrey Reutsky
|align=left|Party of Pensioners
|4,246
|2.72%
|-
| colspan="5" style="background-color:#E9E9E9;"|
|- style="font-weight:bold"
| colspan="3" style="text-align:left;" | Total
| 159,948
| 100%
|-
| colspan="5" style="background-color:#E9E9E9;"|
|- style="font-weight:bold"
| colspan="4" |Source:
|
|}

References

Russian legislative constituencies
Politics of Sevastopol